This is a list of candidates for the 1860 New South Wales colonial election. The election was held from 6 to 24 December 1860.

There was no recognisable party structure at this election.

Retiring Members
John Black MLA (East Sydney)
Alexander Campbell MLA (Williams)
John Campbell MLA (Glebe)
Daniel Cooper MLA (Paddington)
John Darvall MLA (Hawkesbury)
Samuel Gordon MLA (Illawarra)
Alexander Hamilton MLA (Monaro)
Thomas Laidlaw MLA (Yass Plains)
Samuel Lyons MLA (Canterbury)
Henry Mort MLA (West Macquarie)
Randolph Nott MLA (Tenterfield)
James Pemell MLA (West Sydney)
Saul Samuel MLA (Orange)
William Wild MLA (Camden)

Legislative Assembly
Sitting members are shown in bold text. Successful candidates are highlighted.

Electorates are arranged chronologically from the day the poll was held. Because of the sequence of polling, some sitting members who were defeated in their constituencies were then able to contest other constituencies later in the polling period. On the second occasion, these members are shown in italic text.

See also
 Members of the New South Wales Legislative Assembly, 1860–1864

References
 

1860